Spectacle Pond may refer to:

Spectacle Pond (Sandwich, Massachusetts)
Spectacle Pond (Wareham, Massachusetts)